Inglow is a rock band from Oslo, Norway, formed in 2000. Since 2009, the band has consisted of Martin Diesen (lead vocals, songwriter), Syver Normann (guitar), Andreas Rustad (guitar), Christian Svendsen (drums) and Ruben Larssen (Bass). Previously, the group also featured bassists Janna Smedhaugen, Kevin Alvaro (now of Marathon) and drummer Joakim Arnesen.

To date, Inglow have released one studio EPs – The End Of Yesterday (EP 2004), one studio album - Till Deaf Do Us Part (CD 2007)  and currently are recording their second studio album "INGLOW".

History
Inglow was formed in 2000 and made their first demo EP "Womb" in 2001. In 2003 the EP "Eclipse" was released followed by the music video for the song "Better" in 2002. In November 2004 the band released their third EP, "The End Of Yesterday" with the music video for the song "Blended Sherry". In September 2007 they released their first studio album, Till Deaf Do Us Part. In November 2007 they supported Muse in Trondheim. It was released three singles from this album, "Not for Sale" (2007), "monster" (2007) and "As I Am" (2008). "As I Am" was on the Norwegian Billboards; VG lista Topp 20 for six weeks in the summer of 2008. The music video for "Not for Sale" was shown on MTV.

In late 2008 bass player Kevin Alvaro left the band. In 2009 toured Inglow Germany with their new bassist Ruben Larssen. They released the single "Remember" in March of that year. It stayed three weeks on VG lista Topp 20. In 2010, drummer Joakim Arnesen was replaced with Christian Svendsen (from The Cumshots, Goth Minister, Tjuder) after an amputation on his left foot. In 2011 they went in DUB Studio to record their second studio album with producer Endre Kirkesola. In 2012 Inglow signed with German manager Oliver Schuette and released the music video for "Free Fallin '". Their second album "INGLOW" was scheduled to be released during 2012.

Inglow has supported Muse, Gluecifer, Span, Animal Alfa, Brett Anderson and TNT.

Members
 Martin Diesen: Vocals
 Syver Normann: Guitar
 Andreas Rustad: Guitar
 Christian Svendsen: Drums
 Ruben Larssen: Bass

Former members 
Yashar Alousha - vocals (1999–2002)
Jan Erik Smedhaugen - bass (1999–2006)
Kevin Alvaro - bass (2006–2008)
Joakim Arnesen - drums (1999–2009)

Discography

Album
 Womb (EP 2001 demo)
 Eclipse (EP 2003 Vineyard Studios)
 The End Of Yesterday (EP 2004 Lost Records/SRC Productions)
 Till Deaf Do Us Part (CD 2007 MTG MUSIC)

Singles
 Better (2002) - from Eclipse (EP 2003 Vineyard Studios)
 Blended Sherry (2004) - from The End Of Yesterday (EP 2004 Lost Records/SRC Productions)
 Not for Sale (2007) - from Till Deaf Do Us Part (CD 2007 MTG MUSIC)
 Monstrum (2007) - from Till Deaf Do Us Part (CD 2007 MTG MUSIC)
 As I Am (2008) - from Till Deaf Do Us Part (CD 2007 MTG MUSIC)
 Remember (2009)
 Free Fallin´ (2012)

Compilations
 Sidespor I(2001)
 Østerås Invitational (2002)
 Sidespor II (2002)
 Sidespor III (2003)
 Bandpromote No. 15 US Compilation (2004)
 Prosjekt 101 (2006 Meet Productions/Musikkoperatørene)

References

External links
 Official homepage

Norwegian alternative rock groups
Norwegian hard rock musical groups
Norwegian punk rock groups
Alternative metal musical groups
Post-hardcore groups
Musical groups established in 2000
2000 establishments in Norway
Musical groups from Bærum